Valdek Pall (30 June 1927 Laius-Tähkvere Parish, Tartu County – 17 April 2013) was an Estonian linguist.

In 1952 he graduated from Tartu State University. 1957-1992 he worked at Estonian SSR Academy of Sciences' Language and Literature Institute.

His main fields of research were Estonian toponyms, Mordvinic languages. He also managed and directed investigations of Estonian dialects.

Awards:
 2002: Wiedemann Language Award

Works

 Ajad ja kõneviisid mordva keeltes (1955, manuscript)
 Põhja-Tartumaa kohanimed I–II (1969, 1977)
 ldamurde sõnastik (1994)
 Ersa keel. Õpiku konspekt ja sõnaloend (1996)
 L'em't'n'e (1997)

References

1927 births
2013 deaths
Linguists from Estonia
Estonian Finno-Ugrists
University of Tartu alumni
Academic staff of Tallinn University
People from Jõgeva Parish